

166001–166100 

|-id=028
| 166028 Karikókatalin ||  || Katalin Karikó (born 1955) is a Hungarian biochemist and researcher of mRNA-technologies for protein therapies. || 
|}

166101–166200 

|-bgcolor=#f2f2f2
| colspan=4 align=center | 
|}

166201–166300 

|-id=229
| 166229 Palanga ||  || Palanga is a seaside resort town in western Lithuania || 
|}

166301–166400 

|-bgcolor=#f2f2f2
| colspan=4 align=center | 
|}

166401–166500 

|-bgcolor=#f2f2f2
| colspan=4 align=center | 
|}

166501–166600 

|-id=570
| 166570 Adolfträger ||  || Adolf Träger (1888–1965), Czech landscape painter || 
|}

166601–166700 

|-id=614
| 166614 Zsazsa ||  || Zsa Zsa Gábor (1917–2016), Hungarian-American actress and socialite || 
|-id=622
| 166622 Sebastien ||  || Sébastien Rodriguez (born 1976) is an assistant professor at the University of Paris Diderot and specializes in remote sensing of planetary surfaces and atmospheres. || 
|}

166701–166800 

|-id=745
| 166745 Pindor ||  || Bartosz Pindor (born 1975), Canadian astronomer with the Sloan Digital Sky Survey || 
|-id=746
| 166746 Marcpostman ||  || Marc Postman (born 1958), American astronomer with the Sloan Digital Sky Survey || 
|-id=747
| 166747 Gordonrichards ||  || Gordon Richards (born 1972), American astronomer with the Sloan Digital Sky Survey who studies the demographics and physics of quasars || 
|-id=748
| 166748 Timrayschneider ||  || Donald Schneider (born 1955), American astronomer with the Sloan Digital Sky Survey || 
|-id=749
| 166749 Sesar ||  || Branimir Sesar (born 1980), Croatian-American astronomer with the Sloan Digital Sky Survey || 
|}

166801–166900 

|-id=886
| 166886 Ybl ||  || Miklós Ybl (1814–1891), a Hungarian architect || 
|}

166901–167000 

|-id=944
| 166944 Seton ||  || Elizabeth Ann Bayley Seton (1774–1821), an educator, spiritual leader and saint. || 
|}

References 

166001-167000